Dilley is the surname of the following people:
 Dilley sextuplets (born 1993), the first surviving set of sextuplets in the United States
Barbara Dilley (born 1938), American dancer, performance artist, choreographer and educator
Ben Dilley (born 1991), American cyclist
Bruno Dilley (1913–1968), German Luftwaffe officer during World War II
Ernie Dilley (1896–1968), English footballer
Gary Dilley (born 1945), American swimmer
 Graham Dilley (1959–2011), English cricketer
Leslie Dilley (born 1941), Welsh production designer and art director
Mark Dilley (born 1969), Canadian race car driver
Michael Dilley, English cricketer 
Philip Dilley (born 1955), British engineer, businessman, and public servant
Whitney Crothers Dilley, American professor of comparative literature and cinema studies

English-language surnames